Scopula dehortata is a moth of the family Geometridae. It was described by Paul Dognin in 1901. It is endemic to Ecuador.

References

Endemic fauna of Ecuador
Moths described in 1901
dehortata
Taxa named by Paul Dognin
Moths of South America